Hala MOSiR (acronym for Miejskiego Ośrodka Sportu i Rekreacji) is an indoor arena in Łódź, Poland. It is mainly used for basketball and volleyball and has a seating capacity for 6,710 people. Sometimes it also use for Pageant arena for Miss Supranational and Mister Supranational that was held with over 70 participant from around the world.

Indoor arenas in Poland
Indoor ice hockey venues in Poland
Sport in Łódź
Buildings and structures in Łódź
Sports venues in Łódź Voivodeship
Volleyball venues in Poland